Elizabeth Rowley (born ) is the current leader of the Communist Party of Canada. A long-time politician, writer, and political activist, Rowley served as a school trustee in the former Toronto borough of East York. Before becoming leader of the Communist Party of Canada, Rowley was leader of the Communist Party of Ontario. She has been a member of the Central Executive of the Communist Party of Canada since 1978, and has campaigned for office many times at the municipal, federal and provincial levels. Rowley was elected the leader of the Communist Party of Canada by the party's Central Committee in January 2016, following the retirement of Miguel Figueroa. She is the first female leader of the Communist Party of Canada.

Early life and activism 
Born in British Columbia in 1949, Rowley attended the University of Alberta in Edmonton, and was active with the Young Communist League of Canada. She joined the Communist Party in 1967. As a young activist, Rowley campaigned against the War Measures Act during the October Crisis in 1970. She was the Party’s youngest candidate in the 1972 federal election, campaigning on issues such as women's reproductive rights, as abortion was then illegal in Canada, as well as calling for an end to the Vietnam War and Canada's participation.  After travelling across the country and spending a short time in Quebec, she moved to southern Ontario and worked as a typesetter apprentice and secretary in Windsor, where she became a local party organizer.

In 1975, she became Ontario Provincial organizer and moved to Hamilton. There, she became involved in many labour struggles to defend jobs, living standards, labour rights, women’s equality, social programs and Canadian sovereignty. While campaigning to ban the Ku Klux Klan, Rowley’s apartment was destroyed by arson and, the following year, her car was fire bombed.

In 1978, Rowley stood for a seat on the Hamilton Board of Control in the last election to that body before it was dissolved prior to the city's 1980 election. Early in the campaign, Rowley was formally asked by the city's Streets and Sanitation Department to remove her election signs from public property, as their placement violated a local bylaw  During her campaign, she advocated for lower property taxes for homeowners, the construction of affordable housing, and a 20-cent bus fare. She told the Hamilton Spectator that she was opposed to amalgamation, a proposed expansion to the Hamilton Airport, the Upper Ottawa Street dump, and cutbacks to cultural funding. On election night, Rowley finished 6th out of 8 candidates with 13,320 votes.

Fight to save the CPC 
During the Communist Party's internal dispute following the dissolution of the Soviet Union, Rowley was one of the first activists expelled from the Party by General Secretary George Hewison after she vociferously opposed his proposals to abandon Marxism-Leninism as an ideology and liquidate the Communist Party of Canada into a broad-left formation. Along with former Party Secretary William Kashtan, Miguel Figueroa, Kimball Cariou and others, she was instrumental in the membership struggle to block attempts to dissolve the Communist Party of Canada during the early 1990s.

Reinstated by the membership, Rowley helped lead an initiative to take Hewison's group to court, becoming the chief negotiator for the pro-Leninist side. The resulting legal settlement saw the assets of the party being split in half, with the Leninist group keeping the Party name. Over 15 per cent of the membership also left the Party during the split. The Communist Party held a new 30th Central Convention in 1991, at which Rowley was again elected to the party leadership. Within a few years, the party had begun another legal challenge, this time to maintain its identity as a registered political party. After the de-registration of the party in 1993, the Figueroa case was launched.

Communist Party of Canada Ontario leader and school trustee 
Rowley moved to Toronto in 1988 after being elected leader of the Ontario Committee of the Communist Party, one of the first women leaders of an Ontario political party. She led the Ontario Committee of the Communist Party in a number of campaigns, including against the Canada-United States Free Trade Agreement, as well as the 1990 general election. For many years Rowley has strongly opposed the NAFTA and other trade agreements that she believes threaten public services, promoted public education and medicare, as well as civil rights and labour causes.

During the mid-1990s Rowley became a powerful grassroots spokesperson against the cutbacks imposed by Mike Harris Conservative government in Ontario, including the Ontario Days of Action. Despite red-baiting, Rowley was elected school trustee in the former Toronto borough of East York for Ward 2. Rowley served along with fledgling politicians like Gail Nyberg and Jane Pitfield from 1994 to 1997, when the board was amalgamated. After her term as school trustee, Rowley returned to the Ontario leadership of the Communist Party of Canada. In 2001, she was again re-elected to the Central Executive Committee of the Communist Party of Canada, and also replaced Hassan Husseini as leader of the Ontario Communist Party around the same time.

Since then, Rowley has been a regular columnist for the People's Voice, a working class newspaper which describes itself as a socialist press. She has also written numerous articles on public resistance in Canada that have been translated into several languages and published around the world. Rowley has spoken at international conferences and progressive forums in Europe, America and Asia, and has represented the Communist Party of Canada several times at the International Meeting of Communist and Workers' Parties. She has been outspoken on issues such as the G20 arrests in Toronto, the  Rob Ford administration, migrant and immigrant rights in Toronto, for a single, secular school board, for public auto insurance, for peace and anti-racism, proportional representation, and much more.

Leader of the Communist Party
Rowley was elected Party Leader by the Communist Party of Canada's Central Committee at a meeting in Toronto on January 30–31, 2016. The change of leadership followed the retirement of Miguel Figueroa, who stepped down for health reasons after serving in the office for 23 years.  Although not the first woman to serve in the Communist Party of Canada's leadership, she is the first female leader of the Communist Party of Canada. In the spring of 2016 Rowley launched a 15-city tour of Canada, speaking to members and supporters of the Communist Party of Canada about the Party's upcoming 38th Central Convention and the CPC's campaign against the Trans Pacific Partnership.

Personal life 
In 1981 Rowley married a steelworker, in the middle of the 125 day-long Hamilton Stelco strike. She is the mother of two adult children. In her spare time, Rowley enjoys gardening at her home in East York, Toronto.

Electoral record

References 

Leaders of the Communist Party of Canada
Canadian federal political party presidents
Leaders of the Communist Party of Canada (Ontario)
Living people
Female Canadian political party leaders
People from British Columbia
Women in Ontario politics
1949 births
Ontario school board trustees
Canadian socialist feminists
University of Alberta alumni
Canadian communists